Newmarket is a former United Kingdom Parliamentary constituency. It was created upon the splitting up of the three member Cambridgeshire constituency into three single member divisions in 1885. The seat was abolished in 1918.

History 
The Redistribution of Seats Act 1885 split the former three-member Cambridgeshire parliamentary county into three single-member divisions. One of these was the Eastern or Newmarket Division. The seat was named after the town of Newmarket, which is famous as a centre of horse racing.  The seat also included the city of Ely which is the seat of a Bishop and the church interest, as well as the middle-class character of the area, contributed to Conservative political strength. The pro-Conservative alliance of the Church of England and the horse racing fraternity of the town of Newmarket was commented upon by Liberals at the time.

The seat as a whole was marginal between the Conservative and Liberal interests, as the Liberals had support in the villages. A suitable rich, horse race loving Liberal candidate could win the seat.

Upon its abolition under the Representation of the People Act 1918, the constituency was combined with the Chesterton (or West Cambridgeshire) division to create a new single member Cambridgeshire seat. Ely was combined with the Wisbech (or North Cambridgeshire) division to create a new Isle of Ely constituency. The two new seats corresponded to the administrative counties of Cambridgeshire and Isle of Ely, which had been created in 1889.

Boundaries

Newmarket lay at the centre of the constituency, although only part of the town (All Saints Parish) was within the parliamentary county of Cambridgeshire and formed part of this seat. The Local Government Act 1888 made the entirety of Newmarket urban sanitary district part of the administrative county of West Suffolk. However this did not affect the parliamentary boundaries until 1918. The small city of Ely was the only other urban area.

The rural parishes in the constituency were: Ashley, Babraham, Balsham, Bottisham, Brinkley, Burrough Green, Burwell, Castle Camps, Carlton, Cherry Hinton, Cheveley, Chippenham, Duxford, Fen Ditton, Fordham, Fulbourn, Great Abington, Great Wilbraham, Hildersham, Hinxton, Horningsea, Horseheath, Ickleton, Isleham, Kennett, Kirtling, Landwade, Linton, Little Abington, Little Wilbraham, Shudy Camps, Pampisford, Sawston, Snailwell, Soham, Stetchworth, Stow cum Quy, Swaffham Bulbeck, Swaffham Prior, Teversham, West Wickham, West Wratting, Westley Waterless, Weston Colville, Whittlesford, Wicken, Wood Ditton.

Members of Parliament

Election results

Elections in the 1880s

Elections in the 1890s

Elections in the 1900s

Elections in the 1910s

See also
Parliamentary representation from Cambridgeshire
List of former United Kingdom Parliament constituencies

References

Sources 
 Boundaries of Parliamentary Constituencies 1885-1972, compiled and edited by F.W.S. Craig (Parliamentary Reference Publications 1972)
 Social Geography of British Elections 1885-1910, by Henry Pelling (Macmillan 1967)

Constituencies of the Parliament of the United Kingdom established in 1885
Constituencies of the Parliament of the United Kingdom disestablished in 1918
Parliamentary constituencies in Cambridgeshire (historic)
Newmarket, Suffolk
Parliamentary constituencies in Suffolk (historic)